Kenlock is a surname. Notable people with the surname include:

Mark Kenlock (born 1965), English cricketer
Myles Kenlock (born 1996), English footballer
Neil Kenlock (born 1950), Jamaican-born British photographer and media professional

See also
Kellock